Hermate Souffrant (born 1 July 1968) is a Haitian judoka. He competed in the men's middleweight event at the 1992 Summer Olympics. Souffrant won a bronze medal in the middleweight category at the 1991 Pan American Games

References

1968 births
Living people
Haitian male judoka
Olympic judoka of Haiti
Judoka at the 1992 Summer Olympics
Pan American Games bronze medalists for Haiti
Judoka at the 1991 Pan American Games
Pan American Games medalists in judo
Place of birth missing (living people)
Medalists at the 1991 Pan American Games